Francheville is a census division (CD) of Quebec, with geographical code 37. It consists of Les Chenaux Regional County Municipality and the territory equivalent to a regional county municipality (TE) of Trois-Rivières (which is a city and also a census subdivision).

It is named after the former Francheville Regional County Municipality, which was abolished in 2002 when its constituent municipalities were reorganized into their current structure.

The division had a population of 143,267 in the Canada 2006 Census.  The 2006 version of Francheville census division differed from the 2001 version in that on January 1, 2002, Saint-Étienne-des-Grès moved from the defunct Francheville Regional County Municipality to Maskinongé Regional County Municipality (thus leaving the census division) and Notre-Dame-du-Mont-Carmel moved from the defunct Le Centre-de-la-Mauricie Regional County Municipality to Les Chenaux Regional County Municipality (thus joining the census division).

References

Census divisions of Quebec